The Encyclopaedia of World Literature is a 10-volume specialized encyclopaedia published by the State Institute of Encyclopaedic Publications in India. The work on the encyclopedia began in 1984 and the first volume came out 10 years later in 1994. The tenth and concluding volume was published in two parts in 2016.

References

External links 
  വിശ്വസാഹിത്യ വിജ്ഞാനകോശം (Online Edition)

Malayalam encyclopedias
1994 non-fiction books
Indian encyclopedias
Encyclopedias of literature
20th-century encyclopedias
21st-century encyclopedias
21st-century Indian books
20th-century Indian books